The St Albans chronicler is a title which may refer to several notable people, including:

 Matthew Paris (c. 1200–1259)
 John of Trokelowe (fl. 1294)
 Thomas Walsingham (died c. 1422)

See also 
 St Albans Abbey